The St. James Park Historic District is a historic district in the West Adams section of Los Angeles, California.  The district is a residential neighborhood surrounding St. James Park consisting of homes built in a mix of Classical Revival, Craftsman and Queen Anne styles.  The district was added to the National Register of Historic Places in 1991.

See also
 List of Registered Historic Places in Los Angeles
 West Adams, Los Angeles, California

References

Further reading

  Jake Doherty, "City May Save Victorian Home," Los Angeles Times, November 8, 1992, page H-9
  Miles Corwin, "Streamlined Rules Used in Effort to Raze Cottage," Los Angeles Times, San Fernando Valley edition, August 14, 1992, page 8

Historic districts in Los Angeles
National Register of Historic Places in Los Angeles
West Adams, Los Angeles
Historic districts on the National Register of Historic Places in California